Donn is a surname. Notable people with the surname include:

 Edward W. Donn Jr. (1868–1953), American architect
 James Donn (1758–1813), English botanist
 Jorge Donn (born 1947), Argentine ballet dancer
 Nigel Donn (born 1962), English former professional association football player